Peter Blackbourn (born 4 April 1957) is a New Zealand cricketer. He played in three first-class matches for Central Districts in 1983/84.

See also
 List of Central Districts representative cricketers

References

External links
 

1957 births
Living people
New Zealand cricketers
Central Districts cricketers
People from Inglewood, New Zealand